The Norwich Theatre Circuit was a prominent network of theatrical venues in East Anglia established in the eighteenth century. It remained one of the foremost institutions of provincial theatre in England until the mid nineteenth century.

Aside from Norwich, the circuit also included Kings Lynn, Great Yarmouth, Cambridge, Bury St Edmunds, Ipswich and Colchester.

The Norwich Company of Comedians was for many years the principal troupe to use the circuit. They carried their costumes, scenery and musical instruments from venue to venue. At each location they would spend six to eight weeks generally timed to coincide with a special event in the town.

From 1786 for and initial 7 year contract the circuit was leased by John Brunton until, in 1799, William Wilkins – who had been an investor since 1768 – took over running the business.

References

18th-century theatre
19th-century theatre
History of East Anglia